Peter Frederick Blaker Bennett, 1st Baron Bennett of Edgbaston, Kt, OBE, JP (16 April 1880 – 27 September 1957), known as Sir Peter Bennett between 1941 and 1953, was a British businessman and Conservative Party politician.

Background and education
Bennett was the son of Frederick C. Bennett and Annie (née Blaker), and educated at King Edward's School, Birmingham, and the University of Birmingham.

Business career
Bennett was chairman and managing director of Joseph Lucas Ltd and also served as a Justice of the Peace for Sutton Coldfield. He was appointed an Officer of the Order of the British Empire (OBE) in 1918, and knighted in 1941.

Political career
Bennett was elected as Member of Parliament (MP) for Birmingham Edgbaston at an unopposed by-election in December 1940 following the death of the sitting MP, former Prime Minister Neville Chamberlain. He held the seat in the general elections of 1945, 1950 and 1951. He served under Winston Churchill as Parliamentary Secretary to the Ministry of Labour and National Service between 1951 and 1952. On 1 July 1953 he was elevated to the peerage as Baron Bennett of Edgbaston, of Sutton Coldfield in the County of Warwick.

Personal life
Lord Bennett of Edgbaston married Agnes, daughter of Joseph Palmer, in 1907. The union was childless. Lord Bennett died in 1957, aged 77, when the title became extinct. His widow, Agnes, Lady Bennett of Edgbaston, died in 1969. They lived at Ardencote, Luttrell Road, Four Oaks, Sutton Coldfield, Birmingham.

References

External links

1880 births
1957 deaths
Conservative Party (UK) MPs for English constituencies
UK MPs 1935–1945
UK MPs 1945–1950
UK MPs 1950–1951
UK MPs 1951–1955
UK MPs who were granted peerages
Officers of the Order of the British Empire
Knights Bachelor
People from Sutton Coldfield
Alumni of the University of Birmingham
Ministers in the third Churchill government, 1951–1955
Hereditary barons created by Elizabeth II